George Han Kim (born March 27, 1973), better known by his Korean name, Johan Kim (Korean: 김조한), is a Korean-American singer and record producer. He is a member of South Korean R&B/hip hop trio Solid. His song "I Want To Fall In Love" has become a mega-hit throughout the country of South Korea. He founded the girl group Unicorn.

Early life
Kim was born in Atlanta, Georgia, and moved to Los Angeles in 1986.

Career
In 1993, he debuted as a member of Solid (솔리드), a South Korean R&B group that pioneered the genre in the 1990s with chart topping hits in Korea. He was the lead vocalist of the trio. After the group separated in July 1997 to take a break from incessant schedule, Kim stayed in South Korea to continue as a solo musician. After 21-year hiatus, Solid reunited in March 2018, not only releasing their fifth studio album, but also announced concert dates in May.

Discography

Studio albums
 1998: Kim Jo Han
 1999: Kim Jo Han Vol. 2 (김조한 2집)
 2001: 2gether 4ever
 2005: Me, Myself, My Music
 2007: Soul Family With Johan
 2015: Once In A Lifetime

Reissues
 2016: 'Forgetting to Forget` Kim Johan 6th album `Once in a lifetime` Repackage (이별은 잊은듯이)

Best albums
 2000: Kim Jo Han Best (김조한 베스트)

Live albums
 2001: Contact (with Fly to the Sky)

Filmography

Television shows

References

External links
 

1973 births
Living people
South Korean pop singers
South Korean rhythm and blues singers
K-pop singers
South Korean record producers
20th-century South Korean male singers
21st-century South Korean male singers
American musicians of Korean descent
Musicians from Atlanta
California State University, Northridge alumni